University of Advancing Technology (UAT) is a private for-profit university in Tempe, Arizona. Founded in 1983, UAT  integrates technology into its general education requirements. The institution offers core classes (e.g., Legal Issues in Technology, Technology and Society, Ethics in Technology), as well as deep sets of courses in each major. Each student is required to complete a "Student Innovation Project" and internship to graduate.

UAT offers Associate, Bachelor's and Master's degrees, on campus and online. The school has an enrollment of approximately 1000 students. UAT also participates in a student exchange with DeMontfort University, UK.

History
Founded in 1983, the University of Advancing Technology was first known as CAD Institute, a small school focused on training engineers and architects in the then new field of computer-aided design. Students came to CAD Institute seeking professional development training and certifications. The institution received accreditation in 1987 by the Accrediting Council for Continuing Education and Training (ACECT) at the diploma and occupational associate's level.

In 1992, CAD Institute founded an initial research center, the Computer Reality Center. The center primarily performed research for the computer graphics industry, with specific emphasis on the field of virtual reality. The institute also shifted to a new accrediting agency, the Accrediting Council for Independent Colleges and Schools (ACICS), which certified it as a college.

In 1996, CAD Institute was accredited as a four-year institution. That same year, the institute began offering educational programs outside the CAD focus. In order to reflect the broadened technology focus of students within the institution, the CAD name was retired in 1997 and the institution was renamed the University of Advancing Computer Technology (UACT).

Associated with a growth in programs and the student body, the institution designed and built a technology-oriented  campus in 1998 in Tempe, Arizona. The building features classrooms, computer labs and computing commons outfitted with approximately 300 computer workstations and an extensive technology infrastructure. Also in 1998, UACT received approval from ACICS to offer a Master of Science in Technology degree. In 2000, it received approval to offer online courses.

The institution made another incremental change in its name in 2002, when it became the University of Advancing Technology (UAT) to recognize that computer technology had evolved beyond the personal computer to encompass all devices that communicate, manage information, and provide connections through all media, including the Internet. In 2003, UAT offered its first online bachelor's degree in game design.

In the fall of 2007, housing facilities for 260 students were opened on campus. That same year, UAT became a candidate with The Higher Learning Commission and an affiliate of the North Central Association. In recognition of the quality of its Network Security program, the university was also designated a Center of Academic Excellence by the National Centers of Information Assurance Education (CAEIAE) sponsored by the U.S. National Security Agency and the Homeland Security Department.

Academics
UAT offers associate, bachelor's, and master's degree programs. There are 20 different undergraduate majors and 5 areas of study at the graduate level, with focus on technology innovation, video game design and programming, digital media, robotics, cyber security, and computer science.

Accreditations, authorizations, and approvals
In 2009, UAT became accredited by The Higher Learning Commission and a member of the North Central Association of Colleges and Schools. to award associate degrees, bachelor's degrees and master's degrees. The school's programs do not have ABET or ATMAE accreditation.

UAT was designated a Center of Academic Excellence by the National Centers of Information Assurance Education (CAEIAE) sponsored by the U.S. National Security Agency and the Department of Homeland Security.

The Network Security curriculum is certified by the US National Security Agency's Information Assurance Courseware Evaluation program for (NSTISSI-4011), National Training Standard for Information Systems Security (INFOSEC) Professionals, CNSSI-4012, National Information Assurance Training Standard for Senior Systems Managers (SSM, NSTISSI-4013), National Information Assurance Training Standard for System Administrators(SA)(NSTISSI-4014), Information Assurance Training Standard for Information Systems Security Officers(ISSO).

Technology forums
UAT hosts an annual technology forum that features guest speakers from emerging technology fields as well as traditional technology fields such as software engineering and programming. Past speakers have included competitive lockpicker Schuyler Towne, software engineer Chris Pope, video game producer Tamir Nadav, and author/video game producer Steven-Elliot Altman.

References

External links
 Official website

University of Advancing Technology
For-profit universities and colleges in the United States
Educational institutions established in 1983
Buildings and structures in Tempe, Arizona
Education in Maricopa County, Arizona
University of Advancing Technology
1983 establishments in Arizona